Brusník is a village and municipality in the Veľký Krtíš District of the Banská Bystrica Region of southern Slovakia.

History
In historical records, the village was first mentioned in 1327 (Buusnuk) as belonging to Sečianky. After it passed to Divín castle.

Genealogical resources

The records for genealogical research are available at the state archive "Statny Archiv in Banska Bystrica,  Slovakia"

 Roman Catholic church records (births/marriages/deaths): 1811-1899 (parish B)
 Lutheran church records (births/marriages/deaths): 1747-1896 (parish B)

See also
 List of municipalities and towns in Slovakia

External links
https://web.archive.org/web/20071217080336/http://www.statistics.sk/mosmis/eng/run.html
http://www.e-obce.sk/obec/brusnik/brusnik.html
Surnames of living people in Brusnik

Villages and municipalities in Veľký Krtíš District